Ralph Tyler Flewelling (1871–1960) was an American philosopher.

Biography

Early life
He was born on November 23, 1871, near De Witt, Michigan, and educated at the University of Michigan, Alma College (Mich.). the Garrett Biblical Institute (Evanston, Ill.), and Boston University.

Career
He was ordained in the Methodist Episcopal ministry in 1896, holding pastorates from 1903 to 1917, and in the latter year becoming professor and head of the department of philosophy in the University of Southern California. In 1918 he was at the Sorbonne, Paris, and was appointed head of the department of philosophy at the American Expeditionary Force University at Beaune, France.

He wrote four books. He also contributed to the Hastings Encyclopœdia of Religion and Ethics (1917), and founded and edited The Personalist (1920).  In 1919–1920 he was president of the Celtic Club.

He died on March 31, 1960, in Glendale, California.

Bibliography
 Christ and the Dramas of Doubt (1913)
 Personalism and the Problems of Philosophy (1915)
 Philosophy and the War (1918)
 Bergson and Personal Realism (1919)
 The Survival of Western Culture (1942)

Sources

External links
 

20th-century American philosophers
American Methodist clergy
Members of the Methodist Episcopal Church
Methodist philosophers
People from DeWitt, Michigan
Philosophers from California
Philosophers from Michigan
University of Michigan alumni
Alma College alumni
Garrett–Evangelical Theological Seminary alumni
Academic staff of the University of Paris
University of Southern California faculty
Boston University alumni
1871 births
American Methodists
1960 deaths
Year of death unknown